The St. Enoch Centre is a shopping mall located in the city centre of Glasgow, Scotland. The centre is located adjacent to St Enoch Square. The Architects were the GMW Architects. The construction, undertaken by Sir Robert McAlpine, began in 1986, and the building was opened to the public on 25 May 1989. It was officially opened by the then-Prime Minister Margaret Thatcher, in February of the following year.

Located on the site of the former St Enoch Station, the building is just off Glasgow's famous shopping thoroughfare, Argyle Street and overlooks the historic St. Enoch Square and the original subway station building. The present St Enoch subway station is accessible by escalators.

Whilst the target of many architectural critics, the building is notable for its massive glass roof, which makes it the largest glass-covered enclosed area in Europe. Not only does this substantially reduce heating and lighting loads – the mall area is lit entirely by natural daylight in summer, whilst the solar heat generated by the roof means that mechanical heating is only required for a week on average per year – it also earned the building its affectionate nickname "The Glasgow Greenhouse". The roof's steel framework was fabricated by the shipbuilders Scott Lithgow.

The glass roofed element surrounds a seven-storey car park, and when originally opened, an ice rink. This was closed in 1999 when a refurbishment programme (initiated to compete with the newer Buchanan Galleries complex), saw it being replaced by more shops and an enlarged restaurant area.

Shopping
Since its opening, St Enoch's anchor tenants were British Home Stores on the eastern end of the complex, and Boots on the western end adjacent to St Enoch square. Although not part of the mall, there is a link bridge over Osbourne Street to the Debenhams department store on the north side of the building – this was originally the historic Lewis's store on Argyle Street which itself had undergone a major renovation prior to St Enoch's opening.

Gallery

Refurbishment

2000-2001

The mall has undergone two major refurbishments. Between 2000 and 2001 the ice rink was closed, and converted into an extended food court, and the second floor above the food court area was converted into an entertainment stage. The Argyle Street exit was demolished and rebuilt with an extended mezzanine level housing a TK Maxx store (now closed), and additional shop units with new escalators to serve them. There were other minor updates - the balustrades and handrails were replaced, and the spiral staircase in the centre of the main mall was removed, whilst the hanging wall gardens on the car park exterior walls were replaced by projection screens.

Post-2008

In 2008, a £100 million refurbishment began that was expected to be complete by the end of 2009, but was eventually completed in mid-2010. In line with the extensions, the original 1980s floor tiling was replaced and the escalators at both ends of the main mall were moved to different locations and renewed.

Hamleys, G-Star RAW, H&M, Schuh Kids and Starbucks are some of the few new retail units as part of the refurbishment. Initially, the shopping centre is aiming to tender to a more upmarket niche to compete well with the high street and rival mall Buchanan Galleries. The Tesco Metro store formerly on Argyle Street relocated to the lower ground level of the extension, whilst the TK Maxx store that was displaced from the mall relocated to the vacant Tesco site.

St Enoch's Square is also being redeveloped in order to encourage a better public communication. The units overlooking the square will be occupied by food outlets to encourage a new civic space for Glasgow on the square and encourage the public to be able to use the space easily.

 Debenham's department store had recently announced that they would be undergoing a renovation as part of the centre's development, including a premier restaurant. This store has since closed.

2016 onwards

At the end of 2016 it was confirmed that the former BHS store site would be redeveloped to introduce a multiscreen cinema, alongside new restaurants and retail stores. Work on the redevelopment began in April 2019, and was completed in 2022.

References

External links

Official web site
St Enoch Centre project details - Clyde Waterfront Regeneration

Shopping centres in Glasgow
Shopping malls established in 1989
1989 establishments in Scotland